Lautaro Agustín Musiani (born 8 February 1996) is an Argentine cricketer. He played in the 2012 ICC World Cricket League Division Five and the 2013 ICC World Cricket League Division Six tournaments. Following the 2013 Division Six tournament, Musiani spent time with several teams in England, including a trial with Northamptonshire County Cricket Club.

In September 2019, he was named in Argentina's Twenty20 International (T20I) squad for the men's tournament at the 2019 South American Cricket Championship. He made his T20I debut for Argentina, against Mexico, on 3 October 2019. In November 2021, he was named in Argentina's squad for the 2021 ICC Men's T20 World Cup Americas Qualifier tournament in Antigua.

References

External links
 

1996 births
Living people
Argentine cricketers
Argentina Twenty20 International cricketers
People from Adrogué
Sportspeople from Buenos Aires Province